Peach Air was a United Kingdom charter airline that operated for two years between 1997 and 1998.

History
Peach Air was formed in 1996. It was part of Caledonian Airways (1988), created to operate for the tour operator Goldcrest.

In 1999, Thomas Cook completed the acquisition of Carlson Leisure Group, who operated Caledonian Airways and Peach Air. This led to a complete rebrand by Thomas Cook of its growing tour operation.

In 2000, Thomas Cook rebranded their charter airline operations as JMC Air, part of a new universal customer-facing brand "JMC".

Flying Colours ordered 2 Airbus A330-200 aircraft to begin long haul operations; these aircraft arrived after the JMC rebrand.

JMC Air was rebranded as Thomas Cook Airlines in 2002.

Thomas Cook Airlines UK then announced a merger with fellow Manchester-founded airline MyTravel Airways. The parent companies had merged in June 2007, with the two airlines merging in November that year.

Fleet
The carrier operated 2 Boeing 737-200 and 2 Lockheed L-1011 Tristar

See also
 List of defunct airlines of the United Kingdom

References

Airlines established in 1996
Airlines disestablished in 2000
British Airways
Defunct charter airlines of the United Kingdom
1996 establishments in England
1998 disestablishments in England
British companies established in 1996
British companies disestablished in 2000